Ship collision is the structural impact between two ships or one ship and a floating or still object such as an iceberg. Ship collisions are of particular importance in marine accidents. Some reasons for the latter are:

 The loss of human life. 
 The environmental impact of oil spills, especially where large tanker ships are involved.
 Financial consequences to local communities close to the accident.
 The financial consequences to shipowners, due to ship loss or penalties.
 Damage to coastal or off-shore infrastructure, for example collision with bridges.

As sea lanes are getting more congested and ship speeds higher, there is a good possibility that a ship may experience an important accident during her lifetime. Higher speeds may cause larger operational loads, like slamming, or excessively severe loads, for example during a collision. Denser sea routes increase the probability of an accident—in particular a collision—involving ships or ships and shore or offshore structures.

Almost 27% of ship collisions occur near coasts and 22% at narrow channels. This is due to disregarding best practices and regulations by navigation officers and masters. In addition, the IMO guidelines for voyage planning are not always followed. Violations usually occur when inadequate safe speed, overtaking or miscommunication with the pilot.

Collisions with wildlife

Large whales and species like sea turtles often suffer lethal wounds from collisions with ships ("ship strikes").

See also
Vessel speed restrictions to reduce ship collisions with North Atlantic right whales
Ramming
List of ships sunk by icebergs

References

 
Maritime incidents